Ana Josefa María de las Echazarreta Pérez Cotapos (baptised 21 March 1864 – May 25, 1927) was a First Lady of Chile.

Ana Echazarreta was born in Santiago, the daughter of Juan Manuel Echazarreta Yrigoyen and of Mercedes Pérez Cotapos Recabarren. She married Juan Luis Sanfuentes Andonaegui on November 11, 1885, and together they had five children. She died in Santiago.

See also
First Lady of Chile

References

External links
Genealogical chart of Sanfuentes family 

1860s births
1927 deaths
Chilean people of Basque descent
First ladies of Chile
People from Santiago
Year of birth uncertain